Karmarong language, also known as Karmai kat or Kar-ket, is the Sino-Tibetan language of the Karmarong people (Tibetan) of Mugu district in Nepal (ISO 639-3: muk, GlottoCode: mugo1238).

Language name 
Karmarong speakers self-identify as "Karmarong," and are referred to as "Karani" by non-Tibetan peoples of the area. Karmarong speakers often refer to their language in general terms such as "Bhote" or "Tibetan." However, when asked the name for their specific native tongue, they use "Karmarong" or "Karmai kat."

Speakers 
Karmarong is spoken by roughly 7,000 people originating from twelve villages along the Mugu Karnali River in Mugum Karmarong Rural Municipality. The language is specifically associated with Karmarong Tibetan people. Diaspora communities of Karmarong can be found in the neighboring districts of Jumla, in the capital city of Kathmandu (Bouddha), and in Manali, India.

Language vitality 
In 2021, a sociolinguistic study found that Karmarong speakers use their language in the domains of daily life and interaction with their own people. It was also discovered that Karmarong is being transmitted to children in the villages. The Ethnologue has assigned EGIDS level 6a "vigorous" to the Mugom-Karmarong (ISO 639-3: muk). This level denotes oral use of Karmarong is stable, and that the speaker population is not decreasing.

Resources 

 Karmarong primer: The Illumination of the Karmarong Language and Writing: Book 1
 Karmarong primer: The Illumination of the Karmarong Language and Writing: Book 2
 Sociolinguistic study: Isensee, Jonathan Paul. (2022). Documentation and Vitality Assessment of the Karmarong Language. Kathmandu: Tribhuvan University.
 Lexicon of Karmarong Language: Appendix A of Isensee (2022) (Tibetan, Devanagari, and IPA)

References 

Central Bodish languages
Languages of Nepal
Languages of India